The Jatco 3N71 transmission was the first 3-speed automatic transmission from Nissan. It was an introduced as a conventional alternative to the then-ubiquitous and popular Borg-Warner Type 35. It was designed for use with rear wheel drive vehicles with longitudinal engines. In 1982, it gained a locking torque converter (L3N71b) for greater efficiency, and gained an overdrive section in 1983 (L4N71b), culminating with preliminary electronic sensors and control functions being added in 1985 (E4N71b).

Applications:

 1969–1971 Nissan 576
 1971–1978 Mazda 616
 1971–1972 Mazda R100
 1971–1973 Mazda Mizer
 1971–1973 Datsun 240Z
 1971–1974 Mazda RX-2
 1972–1976 Mazda 818
 1972–1977 Mazda 808
 1972–1979 Datsun 620
 1972–1982 Nissan 180B
 1972–1982 Nissan 200L
 1972–1982 Datsun 240C
 1972–1982 Datsun 260C
 1972–1977 Mazda RX-3
 1973–1982 Ford Courier
 1974–1978 Mazda RX-4
 1974–1979 Datsun 260Z
 1975–1978 Datsun 280Z
 1975–1977 Mazda Roadpacer
 1976–1978 Mazda Cosmo
 1977–1980 Mercury Monarch
 1977–1983 Mazda GLC
 1978–1982 Mazda Montrose
 1979–1986 Datsun 720
 1980–1982 Mazda 626
 1980–1983 Nissan 200SX
 1980–1983 Datsun 280ZX
 1980–1982 Nissan Maxima
 1980–1983 Mazda RX-7
 1982–1985 Mazda Pickup
 1986–1987 Nissan Pathfinder
 1986–1987 Nissan Pickup
 1986–1993 Mazda Pickup

See also
List of Jatco transmissions

3N71